Sapromyzosoma is a subgenus of small flies of the family Lauxaniidae.

Species
S. cabrilensis Carles-Torla, 1993
S. drahamensis Villeneuve, 1921
S. israelis Yarom, 1990
S. laevatrispina Carles-Tolra, 1992
S. maghrebi Papp, 1981
S. parallela Carles-Tolra, 1992
S. quadricincta Becker, 1895
S. quadripunctata (Linnaeus, 1767)
S. senilis Meigen, 1826
S. talyshensis Shatalkin, 1998

References

Lauxaniidae
Insect subgenera